Our Lady of Lourdes High School was a coeducational Catholic high school in River Rouge, Michigan.  The school was opened in 1913 and closed in 1974.

References

High schools in Michigan
Defunct Catholic secondary schools in Michigan
1913 establishments in Michigan